Richard "Dick" Manning is an American environmental author and journalist who writes about music, neuroscience, and agriculture.

Career
Manning is the author of 11 books  and has worked as a journalist, reporter and editor for more than 40 years, including four years at the Missoulian. In 1995 he was the recipient of a John S. Knight Fellowship from Stanford University. He is a three-time winner of the Seattle Times C.B. Blethen Award for Investigative Journalism, and also won the Audubon Society Journalism Award and the inaugural Richard J. Margolis Award in 1992.

He writes frequently about the environment, neuroscience and music. He was a senior research associate at the National Native Children's Trauma Center based at the University of Montana, where he wrote about trauma and poverty. In addition to his eleven books, his articles have been published in Harper's Magazine, The New York Times, The Los Angeles Times, Audubon and The Bloomsbury Review.

Personal life 
He lives with his wife, Tracy Stone-Manning, in Montana and Washington, D.C.

Books
Last Stand (1991) 
A Good House (1994) 
Grassland (1997) 
One Round River (1998) 
Food's Frontier (2001) 
Inside Passage (2001) 
Against The Grain: How Agriculture Has Hijacked Civilization (2004) 
Rewilding the West: Restoration in a Prairie Landscape (2009) 
It Runs in the Family (2013) 
Go Wild: Free Your Body and Mind from the Afflictions of Civilization (2014) 
If It Sounds Good, It is Good (2020)

References

External links
Official website

Living people
American non-fiction environmental writers
Writers from Missoula, Montana
American agricultural writers
American male non-fiction writers
Agricultural writers
1951 births